Qaramusalı (also, Karamusaly) is a village and municipality in the Goranboy Rayon of Azerbaijan.  It has a population of 1,200.  The municipality consists of the villages of Qaramusalı and Həmənli.

References 

Populated places in Goranboy District